Lea Müller (born May 7, 1982) is a Swiss orienteering competitor and World Champion. She participated on the Swiss winning team (Relay) in the World Orienteering Championships in Aichi 2005. She also won the World Games (Relay) in 2005 with the Swiss team.

References

External links
 

1982 births
Living people
Swiss orienteers
Female orienteers
Foot orienteers
World Orienteering Championships medalists
World Games medalists in orienteering
Competitors at the 2005 World Games
Junior World Orienteering Championships medalists